Pareledone is a genus of octopuses in the family Megaleledonidae.

Species
 Pareledone adelieana  (Berry, 1917) 
 Pareledone aequipapillae Allcock, 2005
 Pareledone albimaculata Allcock, 2005
 Pareledone antarctica (Thiele, 1920) *
 Pareledone aurata Allcock, 2005
 Pareledone charcoti (Joubin, 1905)
 Pareledone cornuta Allcock, 2005
 Pareledone felix Allcock, Strugnell, Prodohl, Piatkowski & Vecchione, 2007
 Pareledone framensis (Lu & Stranks, 1994) 
 Pareledone harrissoni (Berry, 1917)
 Pareledone panchroma Allcock, 2005
 Pareledone polymorpha (Robson, 1930)
 Pareledone prydzensis (Lu & Stranks, 1994 )
 Pareledone serperastrata Allcock, 2005
 Pareledone subtilis Allcock, 2005
 Pareledone turqueti (Joubin, 1905), Turquet's octopus

The species listed above with an asterisk (*) are questionable and need further study to determine if they are valid species or synonyms.

References

External links

 

Octopodidae
Cephalopod genera